Indrajeet Patel  (born 15 January 1994) is an Indian long-distance runner who competes in distances ranging from 3000 metres to the half marathon. He won the national title in the 10,000 metres in 2012. He was the 5000 metres champion at the 2014 All-India Inter-State Championships and is twice a winner at the Mumbai Half Marathon. He represented India at the 2010 Summer Youth Olympics

Career
Patel hails from Allahabad, Uttar Pradesh and was an alumnus at Guru Govind Singh Sports College, Lucknow and Dr. Ram Manohar Lohia Avadh University. He set national under-20 records in the 5000 metres and competed for India in the 3000 metres finals at the 2010 Summer Youth Olympics and the 2011 World Youth Championships in Athletics. He was also the winner of the 3000 m Asian Area Qualification Championship held in Singapore on 22 and 23 May 2010, clocking 8:16:26 to beat Japan's Kazuto Nishiike. He was the Indian National Youth Champion in the 3000 metres in 2011, and the National Junior Champion in the 5000 metres in 2012.

He first came into limelight as a senior road runner after winning the Mumbai Half Marathon in 2014.

International competitions

National titles
Indian Athletics Championships
10,000 m: 2012
All-India Inter-State Championships 
5000 m: 2014

References

External links

1995 births
Living people
Athletes from Uttar Pradesh
Sportspeople from Allahabad
Indian male middle-distance runners
Indian male long-distance runners
Athletes (track and field) at the 2010 Summer Youth Olympics
Guru Gobind Singh Sports College, Lucknow alumni
Dr. Ram Manohar Lohia Avadh University alumni